Sergey Sergeyevich Frantsev (born 17 March 1959) is a professional association football coach from Russia.

Managerial career

Nõmme Kalju
On 5 November 2015, Frantsev was named as manager of the Estonian Meistriliiga club Nõmme Kalju. After finishing third both in 2016 and 2017 Frantsev and Kalju finally  won the league title in 2018. Kalju also won the pre season Estonian Supercup in 2019. The club's best result under Frantsev in European competitions was the third qualifying round in the 2016–17 UEFA Europa League, beating Maccabi Haifa on the way. Frantsev was sacked on 25 April 2019 due to a poor start to the 2019 season.

References

External links
 

1959 births
Living people
Soviet footballers
FC Avangard Kursk players
Russian football managers
FC Dynamo Saint Petersburg managers
FC Baltika Kaliningrad managers
FC Torpedo Minsk managers
FC Volga Nizhny Novgorod managers
JK Sillamäe Kalev managers
Nõmme Kalju FC managers
Russian expatriate football managers
Expatriate football managers in Belarus
Expatriate football managers in Estonia
Association footballers not categorized by position
Herzen University alumni